Brooklands is a rural locality in the South Burnett Region, Queensland, Australia.

History 
Barker's Creek Provisional School opened on 16 September 1895. In 1909 it became Barker's Creek State School in 1909. It closed in 1954. It was located on the western bank of Barker Creek between Taabinga Road and Nanango Brooklands Road.

Middle Creek Provisional School opened on 16 October 1916. On 1 September 1920, it became Middle Creek State School. In 1971 it was renamed Brooklands State School. It closed on 29 June 1973.

References 

South Burnett Region
Localities in Queensland